Tubulin-folding cofactor B is a protein that in humans is encoded by the TBCB gene.

References

Further reading